Olustee may refer to:

Olustee, Alabama, a populated place near in Pike County, Alabama
Olustee, Florida, a town in Baker County, Florida
Battle of Olustee, the largest battle fought in Florida during the American Civil War
Olustee Creek, a tributary of the Santa Fe River near Olustee
Olustee, Oklahoma, a town in Jackson County, Oklahoma